John William Frederick James Petts (born 2 October 1938) is an English former professional football player and manager.

Career
Petts, who played as a wing half, joined Arsenal in 1954, and made 32 appearances for them in the Football League. He later played for Reading and Bristol Rovers, before playing non-league football with Bath City.

Petts later had a spell as manager of Northampton Town between 1977 and 1978.

Personal life
His son Paul was also a professional footballer.

References

1938 births
Living people
English footballers
English football managers
Arsenal F.C. players
Reading F.C. players
Bristol Rovers F.C. players
Bath City F.C. players
English Football League players
Northampton Town F.C. managers
Association football wing halves